The Wellingborough Tramway was an industrial narrow-gauge railway that connected a series of ironstone mines and quarries with the Midland Railway and later with the ironworks on the north side of Wellingborough. In various forms, the tramway operated between 1875 and 1966.

History

Rixon's Ironworks 
In 1870, Wellingborough businessman James Rixon opened a brickworks on the west side of the Midland Railway line, opposite the terminus of the Finedonhill Tramway. In 1874, they expanded into iron ore quarrying, leasing land for a quarry to the south of Finedon village. They laid a  gauge horse-drawn tramway along the side of the Finedon Road (now the A510) to transport the ore to sidings just to the north of their brickworks.

By 1884 their ironstone quarrying was more successful than their brickworks, and they installed a blast furnace at the western end of the tramway in order to maximise profits from their ore. They expanded the leases of land to the south and west of Finedon, and extended their tramway to over 4 miles. 1884 also saw the purchase of two steam locomotives to operate the tramway, the second arriving in 1887.

Wellingborough Iron Company 
Despite their booming iron trade, Rixon's company was declared bankrupt in 1887. A new company, the Wellingborough Iron Company, was formed in 1888 to take over Rixon's business. This new company significantly expanded the ironworks, and relaid the tramway on a new alignment, which passed under the Midland Railway line in a tunnel, and avoided running alongside the Finedon Road. Three new, larger steam locomotives were purchased and the original locomotives sold off.

Quarrying operations expanded during the 1890s and 1900s, with new land leases being taken to support quarrying. In 1911 the Thingdon Quarry immediately south of Finedon was leased from Neilson's. From 1913, a number of underground adits were driven from the quarry face eastwards to access deeper ore deposits. These eventually extended to dozens of miles of tunnels and galleries running towards Irthlingborough. These mines were served by horse-hauled  gauge tramways.

In 1926 the ore quarries at Sidegate Land that John Clark had been operating were taken over by the Wellingborough Iron Company, and the tramway was extended to serve them. Further underground mines were started at Glebe Quarry 1922, eventually reaching and merging with the Thingdon Mines; these too were served by a  gauge tramway which tipped its output into the metre gauge tramway wagons.

Stanton Ironworks Company 
In late 1932, the Wellingborough Iron Company was purchased by the Stanton Ironworks and the ironworks at Wellingborough was closed down. Stanton overhauled the iron-making process, equipping a completely new and larger ironworks. The tramway was rebuilt using heavier rail that allowed larger trains to be run. To operate these trains, three new Peckett locomotives were purchased to replace the Hunslets. These new locomotives were substantially more powerful, being based on a standard gauge design.

All open-cast quarrying was abandoned, with all ore being extracted from the combined Thingdon/Glebe mines. Five new  gauge Ruston & Hornsby diesel locomotives were purchased to work the underground trains. These mines were expanded throughout the 1930s.

Stewarts and Lloyds 
In 1939, just before the outbreak of the Second World War, Stanton Ironworks was acquired by Stewarts & Lloyds. The efficient Stanton operation continued as before, though the war saw a sharp increase in demand for iron and steel for the war effort. In 1940, Britain's first walking dragline excavator was used at Finedon Top Lodge Quarry which made deeper opencast quarrying viable. the underground mines were abandoned in 1947 and ore extraction concentrated on the opencast pits.

Demand for Finedon ore began to drop from the late 1950s. Stewarts and Lloyds began supplying ore to the Wellingborough ironworks from their extensive quarries at Corby, and the output of the Finedon pits was transferred from the metre gauge tramway to standard gauge wagons and taken to the steelworks at Irlam. By 1962 only one pit near Finedon was still in use. The Wellingborough Ironworks closed down at the end of 1962. Ore continued to be quarried near Finedon until 1966, when the final pit and the tramway were closed. It was the last industrial narrow gauge railway operating in The Midlands ironstone industry.

Locomotives

References 

Metre gauge railways in England
2 ft 4 in gauge railways in England
Industrial railways in England
Wellingborough